Jaio.Musika.Hil is the fifth studio album by Basque alternative rock band Berri Txarrak and the first one as a power trio without the guitar player Aitor Oreja as a member of the band. It was released in 2005.

Track listing
Zertarako amestu
Berba eta irudia
Oreka
Iparra galdu: Hegora joan
Jaio.Musika.Hil
Onak eta txarrak
Iraultza Txikien Asanblada
Bueltatzen
Kezkak
Isiltzen banaiz
Breyten
Gelaneuria

Critical recognition

Rock Estatal - Best album of 2005

References

2005 albums
Berri Txarrak albums